Shawn Daniels (born May 14, 1979) is a former American professional basketball player. He played in the Philippine Basketball Association  with Air21, Burger King, and Talk 'N Text and last played with the London Lightning basketball team in National Basketball League of Canada.

High school and college career

During his senior campaign, Daniels led Highland High School to a 28–5 record en route to the Valley Championship. His senior averages of 24 points and 13 rebounds had him making the all-league and all-conference selection. He was also a two-time Player of the Year.

As a freshman for Bakersfield Junior College, he averaged 17.6 points and 10.5 rebounds per game. During his sophomore season, he scored more than 20 points thirteen times to garner averages of 17.7 points and 11.7 rebounds. During his 66-game college career, Daniels registered 44 double-doubles and was a two-time all-Western State Conference selection. He averaged 17.7 points on .592 shooting, 11.4 rebounds. 2.8 blocks and 1.7 steals in his two-year career, where he was the second-leading scorer for his team.

Daniels then moved to Utah State of the NCAA Big West Conference, being named the conference's "Newcomer of the Year" by Street & Smith's Basketball Magazine. As a junior, he was a first-team all-Big West selection on averages of 12.0 points on .581 shooting, 7.9 rebounds, 1.7 blocks and 1.3 steals in 34 games. His 58 blocks ties for first on the USU single-season blocks list with Gilbert Pete, and his 267 rebounds were the 20th most. Leading the team in every category except steals, Daniels also led the league in rebounds and double-doubles (7). He was named co-MVP of the three-game Big West Tournament with teammate Troy Rolle, where he averaged 9.7 points, 6.7 rebounds, and 3.0 blocks, and shot 57.1 percent. Daniels was also named Big West Defense Player of the Year while leading the team to the second round of the NCAA Tournament.

Pro career

Daniels has played in various leagues, most notably powering the Air21 franchise of the Philippine Basketball Association to third place in 2005, under former head coach Bo Perasol. In a second tour of duty for the franchise, Daniels towed the team to the quarterfinals with him averaging 23 points and 17 rebounds per game during the 2007 PBA Fiesta Conference.

On October 21, 2011, it was announced that Daniels had made the final 12-man roster for the National Basketball League of Canada's London Lightning.

Player profile
Daniels is a defensive player, who is skilled at both anticipating passes and making steals and possesses an ability to block shots despite being only 6'7". A solid offensive player, he is also a great ball handler that can bring the ball up on both fast breaks and against presses.

References

External links
 PBA-online.net Player profile
 Shawn Daniels Player Profile

1979 births
Living people
American expatriate basketball people in Canada
American expatriate basketball people in Mexico
American expatriate basketball people in the Philippines
American men's basketball players
Bakersfield Jam players
Bakersfield Renegades men's basketball players
Barako Bull Energy players
Centers (basketball)
Dakota Wizards (CBA) players
London Lightning players
Pioneros de Los Mochis players
Philippine Basketball Association All-Stars
Philippine Basketball Association imports
Basketball players from Bakersfield, California
TNT Tropang Giga players
Utah State Aggies men's basketball players